Matthew Ofori Dunga (born 9 November 1999) is a Ghanaian professional footballer who plays as a centre-back for Ghanaian Premier League side Accra Great Olympics.

Career 
Dunga previously played for Amidaus Professionals. He joined Accra Great Olympics ahead of the 2019–20 Ghana Premier League. He immediately became a key member of the side that season forming a defensive partnership with Jamal Deen Haruna and  Philip Nii Sackey. He featured in 12 league matches before the league was put on hold and later cancelled due to the COVID-19 pandemic. He was named in the club's squad for the 2020–21 Ghana Premier League season, but after featuring in 4 league matches he picked up an injury in a match 2–0 loss to Liberty Professionals on 13 December 2020. He sustained the injury to his ankle and was to stay on the sidelines for 3–4 weeks.

References

External links 

 

Living people
1994 births
Association football defenders
Ghanaian footballers
Accra Great Olympics F.C. players